Charles Kiva Krieger (April 5, 1914 – June 17, 1982) was an interim mayor of Jersey City, New Jersey. He served as mayor for three months in 1971.

Krieger emigrated to the United States to flee from Nazi persecution in his native Austria.

At the time of his death, Krieger had just beaten William H. Link for the Republican nomination for the United States House of Representatives. He had changed his party affiliation in April 1981.

References

1914 births
1982 deaths
Mayors of Jersey City, New Jersey
Jewish American people in New Jersey politics
Jewish mayors of places in the United States
New Jersey Democrats
New Jersey Republicans
Jewish emigrants from Austria to the United States after the Anschluss
20th-century American Jews